Kattertooq, meaning 'where there is much blue ice' in the Greenlandic language,) is a fjord of the King Frederick VI Coast in the Sermersooq municipality, southeastern Greenland.

Geography
Kattertooq is located north of the King Dan Peninsula (Kong Dan Halvø). It is oriented in a NW/SE direction and has a tributary fjord branching eastwards 25 km from its mouth. To the east it opens into the North Atlantic Ocean with Uiivaq island on the northern and the entrance of Sehested Fjord (Uummannap Kangertiva) and Griffenfeld Island on the southern side of its mouth. 

This fjord has a large, active glacier at its head, the Skinfaxe Glacier, which has its terminus in the fjord shortly after its confluence with the Tjasse Glacier joining it from the west.

History
Uivaq is a Paleo-Eskimo archaeological site near the entrance to a sound on Kattertooq's northern coast.

{ "type": "ExternalData", "service": "geoshape", "ids": "Q24576652", "properties": { "fill": "#0050d0"}}

See also
List of fjords of Greenland

References

External links
The mineral resource assessment project, South-East Greenland - GEUS
Geology & Ore No. 14 - GEUS
Fjords of Greenland
Sermersooq